Senator McDonald may refer to:

Members of the United States Senate
Alexander McDonald (American politician) (1832–1903), U.S. Senator from Arkansas from 1868 to 1871
Joseph E. McDonald (1819–1891), U.S. Senator from Indiana from 1875 to 1881

United States state senate members
Albert McDonald (1930–2014), Alabama State Senate
Andrew J. McDonald (born 1966), Connecticut State Senate
Charles James McDonald (1793–1860), Georgia State Senate
Donald A. McDonald (1833–1906), Wisconsin State Senate
Edward F. McDonald (1844–1892), New Jersey State Senate
Jesse Fuller McDonald (1858–1942), Colorado State Senate
John McDonald (Maine politician) (1773–1826), Maine State Senate
Roy J. McDonald (born 1947), New York State Senate
Simon S. McDonald (1869–1956), North Dakota State Senate
Vickie D. McDonald (born 1947), Nebraska State Senate

See also
Senator MacDonald (disambiguation)